The saltmarsh topminnow is a species of killifish for the family Fundulidae. It occurs in the costal wetlands of the Gulf of Mexico in the United States.

Description
Saltmarsh topminnows have little color in life; there is cross-hatching on the back and sides that may be gray-green or fainter and 12 to 30 dark round spots are often arranged in rows along the midside of the body from above the pectoral fin to the base of the caudal fin.

Ecology
Saltmarsh topminnows live in estuaries, coastal salt marshes and back water sloughs including shallow tidal meanders of Spartina marshes. They are endemic to brackish water areas from Galveston Bay, Texas to Escambia Bay in the western panhandle of Florida.

Conservation
Habitat alteration, dredging, and marsh erosion are the most serious threats to the saltmarsh topminnow.

Conservation Designations
IUCN: Vulnerable.

American Fisheries Society: Threatened in Florida, Vulnerable elsewhere.

Species of Greatest Conservation Need: FL, LA, MS.

Status Reviews
In 2006 the Species of Concern Grant program  funded the Mississippi Department of Marine Resources for the study: “Fundulus jenkinsi, Saltmarsh Topminnow: Conservation Planning and Implementation”.

Species description and etymology
Fundulus jenkinsi was described in 1892 as Zygonectes jenkinsi by Barton Warren Evermann with the type locality given as Dickinson Bayou, near Galveston, Texas. The specific name honours the American physiologist Oliver Peebles Jenkins  (1850-1935) of Stanford University.

References

NMFS. Species of Concern Fact Sheet . 2008

Saltmarsh topminnow
Endemic fauna of the United States
Fish of the Eastern United States
Fish of the Gulf of Mexico
Fauna of the Southeastern United States
Fish described in 1992